David James Greetham (born 10 July 1975 in Liss, Hampshire) is a former English cricketer. He was a right-handed batsman and right-arm medium-fast bowler who played for the Hampshire Cricket Board.

Greetham made his debut for the side during the 2001 38-County Cup, taking figures of 2-1 from 3.5 overs in his second of two matches in the competition.

Greetham made his List-A debut in the 2002 Cheltenham & Gloucester Trophy in September 2001 against Ireland, taking the first two wickets of the Ireland innings, and contributing two runs with the bat.

Greetham made two further List A matches in the 2003 Cheltenham & Gloucester Trophy, scoring six runs in his first match in the competition and a duck in the second and final match of his career against Staffordshire.

During the 2006 season, Greetham played for Hursley Park in the Southern Premier Cricket League, though the team finished second-bottom of the table.

External links
David Greetham at Cricinfo
David Greetham at CricketArchive

1975 births
Living people
People from Liss
English cricketers
Hampshire Cricket Board cricketers